Son Records was set up in 1998 by Alastair Nicholson (formerly of Ninja Tune), to provide an outlet for hip-hop coming out the UK, whether by established names or up and coming talent. With over 40 releases to date, Son has put out debut releases from some of the hip-hop artists in the country, including C-Mone, Cappo, DPF, the Pitman, Styly Cee and Wordsmith, along with releases from musical dons like Def Tex, HKB Finn and Mad Doctor X.

Artists
 Amir Mahdavi A.K.A Kiddoo
 Cappo
 C-Mone
 Def Tex
 DPF 
 HKB Finn
 Lost Island
 MC Pitman
 Mad Doctor X 
 Quakes
 Styly Cee 
 UK Kartel
 Wordsmith

External links 
 Official web-site

See also
 List of record labels

British independent record labels
Electronic music record labels
Hip hop record labels
British hip hop record labels